Dennis Woodside (born 1969) has been President of Freshworks since September 2022. Before Freshworks, he served as President of Impossible Foods from March 2019 until August 2022. He previously served as the chief operating officer of Dropbox from April 2014 until December 2018. He served as an advisor to Dropbox from September through December 2018. Before Dropbox, Woodside was the chief executive officer of Motorola Mobility from its acquisition by Google, Inc. in May 2012 until April 2014. He was the successor to Sanjay Jha. Dennis Woodside joined Google in 2003 and was responsible for leading sales operations in Europe, the Middle East, and Africa. Woodside, before becoming the CEO of Motorola Mobility, was the senior vice president of Google's America operations. On February 12, 2014 it was reported he joined cloud storage company Dropbox as COO. This move came after Google announced the sale of Motorola Mobility to Lenovo in January 2014.

Woodside graduated from Cornell University in 1991, where he rowed and earned two varsity letters. He then went to Stanford Law School, graduating in 1995, after which he was selected for a clerkship on the United States Court of Appeals for the Second Circuit for Judge Dennis Jacobs. After his clerkship, he worked at the law firm of Munger, Tolles & Olson from 1996 until 1998. In July 1998, Woodside joined the Los Angeles office of McKinsey & Company, where he led strategy, technology, and media projects with Shona Brown, Michael Wolf, and Byron Auguste. He left McKinsey in 2003 to join Google.

Woodside served on the board of ServiceNow from April 2018 until August 2022. He currently serves on the board of the American Red Cross.

Personal life

Woodside is a triathlon enthusiast and 15-time Ironman Triathlon finisher, with personal best of 9:22 at the Arizona Ironman in 2016. He got 2nd place in his age group, which qualified him for the Ironman World Championship in Kona, Hawaii in October 2017. Woodside met his wife when they attended Stanford Law School together. They have two children and two cats named Pumpkin and Skittles. Woodside currently resides in the San Francisco Bay area.

References 

Living people
American technology chief executives
Google employees
Motorola employees
1969 births
American chief operating officers
Cornell University alumni
Stanford Law School alumni
20th-century American businesspeople
People associated with Munger, Tolles & Olson